John Carling was a writer of historical fiction novels. He is best known for his novel The Doomed City (1910).

Novels
The Shadow Of The Czar (1902)
The Viking's Skull (1904)
The Weird Picture (1905)
By Neva's Waters (1907)
The Doomed City (1910)

Notes and references

External links
 
 
 

20th-century American novelists
American male novelists
20th-century American male writers